Emperor Wilhelm  may refer to:

 Wilhelm I, German Emperor (1797–1888), King of Prussia
 Wilhelm II, German Emperor (1859–1941), King of Prussia